Bryan Pleitner (born 9 December 1945) is  a former Australian rules footballer who played with Footscray and Hawthorn in the Victorian Football League (VFL) and for West Perth in the West Australian Football League (WAFL).

Notes

External links 
		

Living people
1945 births
Australian rules footballers from Victoria (Australia)
Western Bulldogs players
Hawthorn Football Club players
Kyabram Football Club players
West Perth Football Club players